Elin's Tower is a Victorian stone tower on Holy Island, located around  west of Holyhead. The castellated folly, which was originally used as a summer house, was built between 1820 and 1850 for the notable Stanley family from Penrhos.  It is named after Elin (anglicised as "Ellen"), the Welsh wife of the 19th-century politician William Owen Stanley.

The building near South Stack was used during both the First and Second World Wars as a coastal observation tower. However, it was abandoned and fell derelict. The restored tower is used as an RSPB information centre, shop and café for the nature reserve in which it is situated, and affords a good view of South Stack and its lighthouse. In 2007, the tower was damaged by vandals who used it for a drunken party.

Gallery

References

External links
 

Grade II listed buildings in Anglesey
Nature reserves in Anglesey
Trearddur